Arrey is a census-designated place in Sierra County, New Mexico, United States.  It lies about 22 miles (35.4 km) south of Truth or Consequences. As of the 2010 census, its population was 232.

In 1890, the town was founded as Bonito when several Hispanic families made a deal with a cattle agent to settle here. The land was then deeded to the Butte Land and Cattle Company after the land was proved. In 1901, a post office was established, with Urbano Arrey as the first postmaster; he gave his name to the community. Today descendants of the original homesteaders still live in the community.

Demographics

Education
Truth or Consequences Municipal Schools is the school district for the entire county. It operates Arrey Elementary School in Arrey. Truth or Consequences Middle School and Hot Springs High School, both in Truth or Consequences, are the district's secondary schools.

References

Census-designated places in Sierra County, New Mexico
Census-designated places in New Mexico